Doug Brown is an American sportscaster who has worked for ESPN Radio since 1993. He is currently the host of SportsCenterNightly.

Brown has previously worked for WSAR (1978–1981), WHLL (1981–1983), WNDS, WBZ Radio (1987), WEEI (1987–1991), WSBK-TV (1993–1996), WABU (1996–1999). He has hosted studio shows for the Boston Red Sox, Boston Celtics, and Boston Bruins and was the Celtics color commentator during the 1990-91 season.

For ESPN Radio, Brown called NBA and college basketball and reported and hosted shows from the Olympics, the World Series, the Final Four, and the 2010 FIFA World Cup.

Brown is a 1978 graduate of the Boston University College of Communication.

Brown is also known by his nicknames, "Dougie Fresh" and "Downtown Dougie Brown."

References

Living people
American television sports announcers
Boston University College of Communication alumni
College football announcers
College basketball announcers in the United States
Major League Baseball broadcasters
Place of birth missing (living people)
Year of birth missing (living people)
National Basketball Association broadcasters
National Hockey League broadcasters
American soccer commentators
American radio sports announcers
Boston sportscasters
Television anchors from Boston